Wesley James "Jim" Liebeler (May 9, 1931 – September 25, 2002) was an American law professor at the University of California, Los Angeles (emeritus) and George Mason University, Warren Commission staff member, and director of the Federal Trade Commission’s Office of Policy Planning and Evaluation.

Liebeler was born in Langdon, North Dakota. He received a BA in 1953 from Macalester College and a JD in 1957 from the University of Chicago Law School where he was a member of the Order of the Coif and served on the editorial board of the University of Chicago Law Review. Prior to joining the Warren Commission, he practiced law on Wall Street. In 1965 Liebeler joined the UCLA Law School, where he taught antitrust law for more than 30 years. In 1999 he joined George Mason’s School of Law and gave courses in antitrust and constitutional political economy law.

Liebeler and his flight instructor were killed in 2002 when their Piper Twin Comanche crashed into New Hampshire's Lake Winnipesaukee. The National Transportation Safety Board summarized the probable cause of the accident: "The flight instructor's failure to maintain airplane control, which resulted in an uncontrolled collision with water."

He was married to Susan Liebeler.

References

1931 births
2002 deaths
Federal Trade Commission personnel
George Mason University School of Law faculty
Macalester College alumni
People from Cavalier County, North Dakota
UCLA School of Law faculty
University of Chicago Law School alumni
Victims of aviation accidents or incidents in 2002
Victims of aviation accidents or incidents in the United States
Warren Commission counsel and staff